Pyapon is a town and seat of Pyapon District as well as Pyapon Township in the Ayeyarwady Region of Myanmar, along the Pyapon River, a distributary of the Ayeyarwady River. It has a population of approximately 65,601 in 2021. It serves as a center for collecting rice from the surrounding agricultural areas, and is home to a diesel-run power plant, using equipment by the German firm Siemens.

The natural beauty of Pyapon attracts tourists to cruise nearby backwaters where nearby mangroves are home to birds, crocodiles and, occasionally, dolphins.

History

The city's name is believed to derive from the Mon name, which literally translates to "rice market." The Mon were the first to settle the city on the Pyapon River, choosing the furthest inland a ship could travel on low tide. In 1782, Badon Min declared Pyapon as a town. The modern city of Pyapon was formally elevated to city status in 1972. 

In the early 20th century, Pyapon reclaimed alluvial marshlands for rice cultivation, attracting a large number of settlers.

Climate

Notable people
 San Hlaing, artist

References

Populated places in Ayeyarwady Region
Township capitals of Myanmar